Guillenia flavescens is a species of mustard plant. It is one of several species known by the common name yellow mustard, though the plant most widely known as yellow mustard is probably Sinapis alba. G. flavescens is a thin-stemmed annual herb growing large, lobed or toothed leaves up to 22 centimeters long around its base, and smaller, less toothed leaves along its gray-pink to brown stem. At intervals along the upper stem appear cream, yellowish, or very pale purple flowers, each somewhat cuboid in shape and about a centimeter long. The tips of the petals around the mouth are curled, flared, or claw-like. The fruit is a thin silique up to 9 centimeters long. This species is endemic to California, where it grows in the valleys and mountains surrounding the San Francisco Bay Area.

External links
Jepson Manual Treatment
USDA Plants Profile
Photo gallery

Brassicaceae
Flora of California
Flora without expected TNC conservation status